Erin Elizabeth Wasson (January 20, 1982) is an American fashion model, actress, fashion designer and stylist.

Early life
Erin Elizabeth Wasson was born on January 20, 1982, in Irving, Texas.

Career
Wasson's modeling career began after winning the Kim Dawson Model Search in Texas.

She has appeared on the covers of numerous fashion magazines, including French, Russian, Spanish and Australian Vogue, French Elle, Flair, Numero, Allure, and Esquire.
She has worked with photographers such as Steven Meisel, Nan Goldin, Mario Testino, Peter Lindbergh, Patrick Demarchelier and Ellen Von Unwerth.

Wasson has walked the runway for Balenciaga, Loewe, Givenchy, Miu Miu, Alexander Wang, Chanel, Shiatzy Chen, Giorgio Armani, DKNY, Roberto Cavalli, Gucci, Anna Sui, Karl Lagerfeld, Alexander McQueen, Calvin Klein, Céline, Louis Vuitton, Badgley Mischka, Dolce & Gabbana, Lanvin, John Galliano, Marc Jacobs, Fendi, Jean Paul Gaultier, Valentino, Jil Sander, Versace, Alberta Ferretti, Oscar de la Renta, Dior, Max Azria, Diane Von Furstenberg, Hugo Boss, Moschino, Carolina Herrera, Dries Van Noten, Prada, Christian Lacroix, Balmain, Yves Saint Laurent, Michael Kors, Helmut Lang, Tommy Hilfiger, Zac Posen, Hermès, Chloé, Isabel Marant, Stella McCartney, Giles Deacon, and Ralph Lauren. She also walked in the Victoria's Secret Fashion Show in 2007.

She has appeared in advertising campaigns for Gucci, Chanel, Dolce & Gabbana, Michael Kors, DKNY, Valentino, Céline, Hugo Boss, Balenciaga, Giorgio Armani, Roberto Cavalli, Paco Rabanne, Blumarine, Cartier, Jil Sander, Alberta Ferretti, Tiffany & Co., Jean Paul Gaultier, Elie Saab, Ann Taylor, Esprit, Rolex, Tiffany & Co., J.Crew, Levi's, H&M, Abercrombie & Fitch, Gap, Scanlan & Theodore, and Zadig & Voltaire. Since 2002, Wasson has been the international face of Maybelline, Clinique and Max Factor, appearing in print ads and television commercials for the cosmetics brands.

In the fall of 2008, she appeared opposite Justin Timberlake in a multimedia campaign for his clothing line, William Rast. The campaign includes a series of short films directed by Jonas Akerlund; Wasson plays Timberlake's love interest, Birdie. She also appeared in the 2011 Pirelli Calendar, photographed by Karl Lagerfeld.

Wasson appeared as the vampire Vadoma in the 2012 horror film Abraham Lincoln: Vampire Hunter.

In 2012 she starred in the music video for "Madness" by English rock band Muse.

In 2008, she worked as a fashion designer for a three-season apparel collaboration with clothing company RVCA. Wasson launched her own line of jewelry, Low Luv, which currently is sold at more than 200 stores worldwide. In fall 2011, she designed a capsule collection for French brand Zadig & Voltaire. In 2018, she designed a four-piece collection for boot brand Lucchese, which ranges in price from $1595–3995.

Personal life 
In July 2018, Wasson married restaurateur Bart Tassy in Austin, Texas.

Filmography

Sources
Elle; September 2003, Vol. 19 Issue 1, p371-381
"Straight talk", Lie, Juliette, Flare, September 2005, Vol. 27, Issue 9
"The Pucks Stopped Elsewhere", Peppard, Alan, Dallas Morning News, January 26, 2007

References

External links

Esquire Magazine Photos 
Erin Wasson at AskMen.com

1982 births
Female models from Texas
Living people
People from Irving, Texas
American film actresses
21st-century American actresses
Actresses from Texas